Tiago André Silva Martins (born 25 June 1987) is a Portuguese football player who plays for Os Sandinenses.

Club career
He made his professional debut in the Segunda Liga for Sporting Covilhã on 11 August 2013 in a game against Marítimo B.

References

1987 births
Living people
Sportspeople from Guimarães
Portuguese footballers
Moreirense F.C. players
Amarante F.C. players
F.C. Vizela players
S.C. Covilhã players
Liga Portugal 2 players
C.D. Trofense players
G.D.R.C. Os Sandinenses players
Association football midfielders